The 1970 LPGA Tour was the 21st season since the LPGA Tour officially began in 1950. The season ran from February 12 to October 25. The season consisted of 21 official money events. Shirley Englehorn won the most tournaments, four. Kathy Whitworth led the money list with earnings of $30,235.

There were two first-time winners in 1970: Kathy Ahern and Jane Blalock.

The tournament results and award winners are listed below.

Tournament results
The following table shows all the official money events for the 1970 season. "Date" is the ending date of the tournament. The numbers in parentheses after the winners' names are the number of wins they had on the tour up to and including that event. Majors are shown in bold.

Awards

References

External links
LPGA Tour official site
1970 season coverage at golfobserver.com

LPGA Tour seasons
LPGA Tour